Mahale Chiniha (Persian: محله ی  چینی ها) is a neighborhood in the center of Gachsaran City, Iran and its most populous area. The buildings are a unique mixture of traditional, modern, Chinese and Islamic architecture. There are also many luxury shopping malls, stores, restaurants, nightclubs and bars frequented by both local people and tourists.

History
Although information about the former use of Mahale Chiniha is scarce, until the early 2000s it was not a densely populated area. However, in 2001, following diplomatic engagement between Iran and China, Mahale Chiniha was considered a location where Chinese culture and architecture could be showcased. Designs for the project were completed in May 2003 with a scheduled construction time of three years, however, a lack of sponsors slowed progress. When nearly a quarter of the buildings were complete, many new private sponsors became involved who wanted Mahale Chiniha to become a trade center. As a result, the development strategy changed and Chinese-themed sky scrapers were built instead of shop buildings in a purely traditional Chinese style.

See also

 Gachsaran

Populated places in Kohgiluyeh and Boyer-Ahmad Province
Chinatowns in Asia